Dmitrii Riabov (born 17 January 1996) is a Russian male badminton player.

Achievements

BWF International Challenge/Series
Mixed Doubles

 BWF International Challenge tournament
 BWF International Series tournament
 BWF Future Series tournament

References

External links 

1996 births
Living people
Russian male badminton players